Ziogouiné is a town in western Ivory Coast. It is a sub-prefecture of Man Department in Tonkpi Region, Montagnes District.

Ziogouiné was a commune until March 2012, when it became one of 1126 communes nationwide that were abolished.

In 2014, the population of the sub-prefecture of Ziogouiné was 9,323.

Villages
The nine villages of the sub-prefecture of Ziogouiné and their population in 2014 are:
 Diapleu (1 284)
 Dioulé (810)
 Gouégouiné (832)
 Gouélé (1 184)
 Kassiogouiné (532)
 Lozonlé (422)
 Tontigouiné (161)
 Trinlé (825)
 Ziogouiné (3 273)

Notes

Sub-prefectures of Tonkpi
Former communes of Ivory Coast